Tullio Farabola (Milano, 8 October 1920 – Milano, 11 December 1983) was an Italian photographer.

Early life

Tullio Farabola was born in Milano, the son of Alessandro Farabola (known as Giuseppe Farabola), owner of a photo studio, and Ambrogina Zanardi. He took up photography following his father's footsteps.

Giuseppe Farabola was born in Milan on 12 December 1885, attended the Accademia di Belle Arti di Brera and the Scuola d'Arte Applicata del Castello Sfrozesco, obtained the diploma of "Specialized Photograph Retoucher". He started working as photographer in 1896 in Milan. In 1911 he co-founded a photo studio with A. Bressani in C.so Ticinese 87 in Milan. A few months later Bressani withdrew and Farabola became the sole owner of the studio. For many years he was the official photographer of the Archiepiscopal Curia of Milan. He photographed famous athletes in his studio, and took passport photos as well as portrait and group photos. He married Ambrogina Zanardi on 22 April 1909, had two children, Ada in 1910 and Tullio in 1920. He retired in 1954 and died in Rapallo on 13 April 1967.

Tullio Farabola attended the Carlo Cattaneo Institute in Milan and graduated in accounting in 1939. During World War II he attended a course in war cinematography at the Istituto L.U.C.E. in Rome. Here he met , the father of Italian photojournalism, founder in 1908 of the "Agenzia VEDO", an Italian photographic agency, who would become a model for him.

In 1943 he came back to Milan; during an allied bombing in August 1943, the Farabola photographic studio, along with the negatives and equipment was destroyed. He documented historical facts from 1943 to 1945: the German occupation, the last speech of Mussolini, the effects and victims of the allied bombing (the photograph of the children who died in the school of Gorla in 1944 became famous), the liberation with the Germans who left the city and the leaders of the Committee of National Liberation who paraded with the partisans through the streets of Milan on 25 April 1945, the exposure of corpses of Mussolini, Clara Petacci and the fascist hierarchs arrested in Dongo in Piazzale Loreto, the shooting of Buffarini Guidi, minister of the interior during the "Repubblica Sociale Italiana".

Creation of the photo agency

After the war Tullio Farabola went back to work as a photojournalist, creating the Farabola photo agency based in C.so Ticinese 60 in Milan.

In those years in Italy photojournalism grew considerably due to the freedom of information regained after 20 years of dictatorship. Publishing required an ever-increasing number of photographs relating to news, entertainment, art and politics: thus a dense network of photo agencies arose. In Milan the most important were Vincenzo Carrese's Publifoto, Tullio Farabola's Farabola and Fedele Toscani's Rotofoto. Crime stories, prohibited during Fascism, caused sensations.

The models for Tullio Farabola were Adolfo Porry Pastorel and the American photojournalists. His photographs from the period 1943 to 1960 are the most dramatic and effective and best represent his style.

Soon Tullio Farabola took care of the development of the photographic agency. He was busy in the studio, creating covers for the most popular weeklies of the time (Oggi, Gente, Radiocorriere TV), album covers (Renato Carosone, Fred Buscaglione) and black and white portraits of characters from the world of culture and entertainment (Salvatore Quasimodo, Eugenio Montale, Riccardo Bacchelli, Indro Montanelli, Giorgio De Chirico, Juliette Gréco). It can be said that in the 1950s and 1960s for a character from the world of entertainment, art or sport, going to Farabola for a photo shoot was a confirmation of success.

The agency made use of collaborators: Franco Gremignani, Lucio Berzioli, Sergio Del Grande, Sergio Bersani, Alberto Guarnerio, Eros Biavati, Settimio Garritano, Angelo Cozzi, Pietro Pascuttini. other Italian photographers, such as Marco Secchi, at the beginning of their career were inspired by Tullio Farabola.

The studio photos were the result of teamwork. Lucio Berzioli was a property finder and had a flair for finding furniture, clothing and other objects that were used to set the images. The style of the black and white portraits was inspired by Yousuf Karsh, while the record covers were inspired by great American advertising photographers who made large format (8×10-inch) transparencies, unusual in Italy.

Historical photographic archive

At the beginning of the 1960s Farabola began organizing a historical photographic archive, one of the most complete and best organized in the country.

On the occasion of the twentieth anniversary of the Italian declaration of war, in 1960, interest of the press grew in images of fascism and war. Later, given the interest of the market, the archive was supplemented by acquisitions of material from other archives. The first important acquisition was the archive of the VEDO Agency of Adolfo Porry Pastorel, which took place in the mid-1950s. Later the archives of Mario Agosto, photographer of the "Italia" Navigation Company (transatlantic liners Conte Grande, Rex, Andrea Doria, Michelangelo and Raffaello), of the portraitists Arturo Ermini and Attilio Badodi, of Giuseppe Felici, (photographer accredited to the Holy See from 1920 to 1970) were acquired. In 1960, photographs of World War II were acquired from foreign agencies and published in the main Italian weeklies. The initiative was very successful and led to enrich the historical archive. Images of the two world wars were purchased from the archive of the Imperial War Museum in London. It was the first photographic material of the Second World War to be imported into Italy. It included aerial shots of the RAF with bombed cities. In Berlin an exchange was made between Italian photos of fascism and German photos of Nazism. Thus were acquired the photos of Hitler taken by Heinrich Hoffmann, some photos of Manfred von Richthofen (the "Red Baron"), of Göring, the hyperinflation of the Weimar republic and other photos of great historical interest. The creation, development and management of the historical archive was largely handled by Alberto Crivelli, collaborator with the agency since 1948 and its director from the death of Tullio Farabola until 1990.

The activity of Tullio Farabola has been documented by numerous publications which focus mainly on news photos, and on the historical archive but there is no publication dealing with the activity carried out in the studio.

Tullio Farabola died in Milan on 11 December 1983.

Some images from his archive are still visible on the A.F. Archivi Farabola, whose activity is aimed at the recovery, conservation and digitization of his images.

Published works, during his life

Published works, after his death

Photobooks with contributions by Tullio Farabola

References

External links

www.archivifarabola.it

20th-century Italian photographers
1920 births
1983 deaths